Dacorum Heritage (DH) is a local history advocacy group in the United Kingdom. It collects and records the history of the Borough of Dacorum, Hertfordshire, in the south of England, and aims to encourage the appreciation of the heritage of Dacorum.

History
In 1979 the Dacorum Museum Advisory Committee (DMAC) was formed to advise Dacorum District Council on heritage matters. In September 1993 the Dacorum Heritage Trust was founded and set up an artefact collection and archive in an old fire station building behind Berkhamsted Civic Centre in 1994.

In 2014, DHT took on responsibility for the paper archive of the local newspaper, the Hemel Hempstead Gazette & Express.  The Trust has also been involved in the preservation of a set of rare pre-reformation religious wall paintings which were uncovered inside a 15th-century cottage at 130–136 Piccotts End. The Trust launched an appeal in 2014 to raise money to buy the row of cottages.

Collections
Although the Trust is an Arts Council England Accredited Museum, it lacks a permanent public display space and operates as a museum store. Its collection is held in Berkhamsted and can only be visited by appointment. The museum store holds over 100,000 objects relating to the history of the local towns of Berkhamsted, Bovingdon, Chipperfield, Flamstead, Hemel Hempstead, Kings Langley, Markyate and Tring. Archaeological artefacts held by the Trust include flint tools from the Paleolithic period, fragments from Roman Villas at Boxmoor, Northchurch and Gadebridge Park; a Romano-British woman's skeleton excavated at Cow Roast, and artefacts from Kings Langley Palace. Also within the Trust's holdings is a collection of prints and engravings by the Hemel Hempstead artist Lefevre James Cranstone.

The Trust also holds historical exhibitions in local libraries, and publishes journals on local heritage.

Museum and art gallery proposals

Dacorum Heritage Trust has proposed that The Bury, a Grade II* listed house in Hemel Hempstead, should be converted into a museum and art gallery for Dacorum, to display a collection of archaeological and historical artefacts from the surrounding area. The project is currently awaiting necessary funding and planning permission to proceed.

See also

History of Hertfordshire
List of lost settlements in Hertfordshire
:Category:Listed buildings in Hertfordshire

References

Advocacy groups in the United Kingdom
Heritage organisations in England
Conservation in England
Archaeological organizations
Organizations established in 1979
1979 establishments in England
Organizations established in 1993
1993 establishments in England
Charities based in Hertfordshire
Dacorum
Berkhamsted
Hemel Hempstead
History of Hertfordshire